Jeff Cremer is a wildlife photographer, and cinematographer. He is better known for taking pictures of butterflies drinking turtles' tears in the Peruvian rainforest. He participated in Smarter Every Day (2011) and Fieldwork in the Peruvian Amazon Forest (2017).
Cremer's photographs have been featured in books, magazines, and in Discovery Channel, National Geographic, Wired, Animal Planet. He has also been published in the world's largest atlas, the “EARTH Platinum Edition”.

See also 

 Peruvian rainforest
 Wildlife photography

References 

Living people
Nature photographers
American photographers
Year of birth missing (living people)